Edward French may refer to:

 Gerald French (Edward Gerald Fleming French, 1883–1970), English cricketer
 Edward French (professor), lawyer, civil war veteran, professor at Wells College, and pioneer to California
 Edward French (bishop) (died 1810), Irish Roman Catholic clergyman; bBishop of Elphin, 1787–1810
 Edward French (make-up artist) (born 1951, also known as Ed French), American make-up artist
 Edward L. French (1860–1947), American politician
 Edward Lee French (1857–1916), English-born officer in the Indian Police Force
 Ed French, actor in the film Blood Rage